Spathantheum is a genus of flowering plants in the family Araceae. The genus contains two species, Spathantheum fallax and Spathantheum orbignyanum. Spathantheum is believed to be closely related to Spathicarpa. The genus is endemic to the Andes of Peru, Bolivia, and northern Argentina and is found growing in grasslands in rocky soil.

Species
 Spathantheum fallax  Hett., Ibisch & E.G.Gonç. - Bolivia
 Spathantheum orbignyanum  Schott - Peru, northwestern Argentina, Bolivia

formerly included
Spathantheum intermedium Bogner = Gorgonidium intermedium (Bogner) E.G.Gonç

References

Aroideae
Araceae genera
Flora of South America